Ricardo Vagnotti (16 October 1916 – 13 June 1988) was a Brazilian fencer. He competed in the individual and team foil and team épée events at the 1936 Summer Olympics.

References

External links
 

1916 births
1988 deaths
Brazilian male épée fencers
Olympic fencers of Brazil
Fencers at the 1936 Summer Olympics
Brazilian male foil fencers
20th-century Brazilian people